Clathrochitina is an extinct genus of chitinozoans. It was described by Alfred Eisenack in 1959. It contains a single species, Clathrochitina clathrata.

References

Prehistoric marine animals
Fossil taxa described in 1959